Pratama is a surname. Notable people with the surname include:

 Angga Pratama (born 1991), Indonesian badminton player
 Dimas Galih Pratama, Indonesian footballer
 Rama Pratama (born 1988), Indonesian footballer

See also
 Pratama (disambiguation)

Indonesian-language surnames